or  is a legendary Indian dynasty in the Itihasa-Purana, considered an offshoot of the  or the Ikshvaku dynasty lineage of kings tracing its ancestry to the sun deity Surya. The dynasty is named after Raghu, a legendary king who protected the sacrificial horse of Ashvamedha from Indra. Raghuvaṃśī kings include Mandhata, Harishchandra, Sagara, Bhagiratha, Dilīpa, Raghu, Aja, Dasharatha and Rama. 

Kalidasa's work, Raghuvaṃśa, narrates the epic of the Raghuvaṃśa in 19 sargas (cantos).

Notable people

Several legendary kings came from the Solar dynasty and are referred to as Raghuvaṃśa after their ancestor, the king Raghu.
 Mandhata, who is said to have ruled the entire earth during the Vedic period, and defeated the Indra-head of Devatas.
 Sagara, a king who was tricked by Indra into a conflict with the sage Kapila, leading to the death of his 60,000 sons, the descent of the Ganges to earth, and his sons' revival
 Harishchandra, the king of Ayodhya, believed to be an exemplar of honesty
 Dilīpa, said to be the most righteous and chivalrous emperors of the Ikshvaku dynasty
 Bhagiratha said to be the legendary king of the Ikshvaku dynasty, who brought the River Ganga, personified as the river goddess Ganga, to Earth from the heavens
 Raghu II, whose descendants are known as Raghuvaṃśa. The Valmiki Ramayana refers to Raghukula, a clan of this king
 Aja, son of King Raghu and grandfather of Rama.
 Dasharatha, son of Aja and father of Rama, Lakshman, Bharath and Shatrughan
 Rama, he is considered the seventh avatar of the god Vishnu. Rama's story before he became king of Ayodhya is recounted in the Ramayana. After he ascended the throne, he performed the Ashvamedha Yajna. Bharata, his younger brother, won the country of Gandhara and settled there
 Lava and Kusha – They were the twin sons of Rama and his wife Sita. Lava ruled south Kosala while Kusha ruled north Kosala, including Ayodhya. Kusha married "Nagkanya" "Kumuddhati", sister of Kumuda. After Kusha the following kings of the solar dynasty ruled Ayodhya: 
 Śuddhodana, leader of the Shakya republic in present day Nepal, with their capital at Kapilavastu. He was also the father of Siddhartha Gautama, who later became The Buddha.
 Sumitra, the last king of Ayodhya from the Raghuvaṃśa, defeated by Mahapadma Nanda.

See also 
 Hinduism
 Solar dynasty
 Lunar dynasty
 Mahabharata
 Puranic chronology
 List of Ikshvaku dynasty kings
 List of Hindu empires and dynasties

References

Dynasties of India